Kakani Venkata Ratnam was a former cabinet minister in Andhra Pradesh in India.

Life
He was born in Akunuru, Krishna district of Andhra Pradesh,, where he was educated  up to primary level. He learned Sanskrit and Hindi languages from a tutor at a neighbouring village, Kunderu. He was attracted to the then freedom struggle movement started by Mahatma Gandhi. As a student youth leader he mobilised youth to join the movement along with others including Pidikiti Madhava Rao, Rebala Buchi Ramaiah Shresty, Kalapala Surya Prakash Rao and Peta Brahmaiah. They organised a meeting at Vijayawada in 1923 which was addressed by Gandhi and later the place was named Gandhi Nagar municipal grounds. He worked in support of the Khadi movement too. Gandhi also visited Akunuru and spent the night he spent at Vuyyuru. Ratnam accompanied Gandhi in his tour programme which stretched up to Mudunuru. Gradually, he became a popular Congress leader and chairman of the Krishna district Congress committee for a long duration.

He was elected for legislative assembly and won three times as Member of legislative assembly in 1962, 1967 and 1972. 
 
He died of a heart attack on 25 December 1972 at the height of the Jai Andhra movement. His sudden death subsided the Jai Andhra movement.

There is a statue commemorating Ratnam in the Benz circle of Vijayawada. There is also a library in his name in Vijayawada on Bandar Road and a marriage function hall in Hanuman Junction. His also has statues in Vizag and the Tanuku Andhra Sugar factory.

His death was on the same day as India's ex-president C. Rajagaoplachary's. His death ceremony was performed with state rituals attended by the then prime minister and other national leaders.

References 

Telugu politicians
1972 deaths
Year of birth missing
People from Krishna district
Indian National Congress politicians from Andhra Pradesh